Frankenstein Girls Will Seem Strangely Sexy (often abbreviated as FGWSSS or simply Frankenstein Girls) is the second studio album by New York City band Mindless Self Indulgence released in 2000. The album is the follow-up to the album Tight. This is the last studio album to feature Vanessa YT on bass guitar.

The track listing on the back cover has all the vowels replaced with asterisks, even in those words that would not generally be considered offensive. They are also listed in alphabetical order. "Bitches" was the album's sole single release and prominently featured a sample of the opening riff to the Siouxsie and the Banshees song, "Happy House." The song credits Siouxsie Sioux and Steven Severin as writing partners due to the use of the sample. A single for the track "Planet of the Apes" was released as a promotional CD only.

The cover of the album was drawn by Jamie Hewlett, the artist known for Tank Girl and Gorillaz. Hewlett offered to make a music video for a song on the album but was rejected by Elektra.

Promo/Advance copies of the album where unmastered and featured slightly different "skit" tracks. They also feature an orchestral intro to "Holy Shit" and do not contain the live performance intro to "Backmask". The digital version of the album available on streaming platforms is one of these promo copies, in contrast to the final CD version.

Track listing

Personnel
 Jimmy Urine – lead vocals, programming, samples, keyboards
 Steve, Righ? – lead guitar, backup vocals, programming, keyboards
 Vanessa YT – bass guitar, keyboards
 Kitty – drums, programming

References 

2000 albums
Elektra Records albums
Mindless Self Indulgence albums